A runlevel is a mode of operation in the computer operating systems that implements Unix System V-style initialization. Conventionally, seven runlevels exist, numbered from zero to six. S is sometimes used as a synonym for one of the levels. Only one runlevel is executed on startup; run levels are not executed one after another (i.e. only runlevel 2, 3, or 4 is executed, not more of them sequentially or in any other order).

A runlevel defines the state of the machine after boot. Different runlevels are typically assigned (not necessarily in any particular order) to the single-user mode, multi-user mode without network services started, multi-user mode with network services started, system shutdown, and system reboot system states. The exact setup of these configurations varies between operating systems and Linux distributions. For example, runlevel 4 might be a multi-user GUI no-server configuration on one distribution, and nothing on another. Runlevels commonly follow the general patterns described in this article; however, some distributions employ certain specific configurations.

In standard practice, when a computer enters runlevel zero, it shuts off, and when it enters runlevel six, it reboots. The intermediate runlevels (1–5) differ in terms of which drives are mounted and which network services are started. Default runlevels are typically 3, 4, or 5. Lower runlevels are useful for maintenance or emergency repairs, since they usually offer no network services at all. The particular details of runlevel configuration differ widely among operating systems, and also among system administrators.

In various Linux distributions, the traditional  script used in the Version 7 Unix was first replaced by runlevels and then by systemd states on most major distributions.

Standard runlevels

Linux 
Although systemd is, used by default in most major Linux distributions, runlevels can still be used through the means provided by the sysvinit project.  After the Linux kernel has booted, the  program reads the  file to determine the behavior for each runlevel.  Unless the user specifies another value as a kernel boot parameter, the system will attempt to enter (start) the default runlevel.

Linux Standard Base specification 
Systems conforming to the Linux Standard Base (LSB) need not provide the exact run levels given here or give them the meanings described here, and may map any level described here to a different level which provides the equivalent functionality.

Slackware Linux 
Slackware Linux uses runlevel 1 for maintenance, as on other Linux distributions;  runlevels 2, 3 and 5 identically configured for a console (with all services active); and runlevel 4 adds the X Window System.

Gentoo Linux

Debian GNU/Linux

Unix

System V Releases 3 and 4

Solaris 
Starting from Solaris 10, SMF (Service Management Facility) is used instead of SVR4 run levels. The latter are emulated to preserve compatibility with legacy startup scripts.

HP-UX

AIX 
AIX does not follow the System V R4 (SVR4) runlevel specification, with runlevels from 0 to 9 available, as well as from a to c (or h). 0 and 1 are reserved, 2 is the default normal multi-user mode and runlevels from 3 to 9 are free to be defined by the administrator. Runlevels from a to c (or h) allow the execution of processes in that runlevel without killing processes started in another.

The S, s, M and m runlevels are not true runlevels, but are used to tell the init command to enter maintenance mode. When the system enters maintenance mode from another runlevel, only the system console is used as the terminal.

See also 

 Init
 Operating system service management
 systemd
 Upstart

Notes

References

External links 
 Runlevel Definition - by The Linux Information Project (LINFO)
 What are run levels? - LinuxQuestions.org
 FreeBSD system startup
 chkconfig, a utility for querying and updating runlevel-controlled services

Unix
Unix process- and task-management-related software